Brookfield is one of three stations on Metra's BNSF Line in Brookfield, Illinois. In Metra's zone-based fare system, Brookfield is in zone C. As of 2018, Brookfield is the 93rd busiest of Metra's 236 non-downtown stations, with an average of 546 weekday boardings. A staffed station is on the south side of the three tracks.

History

Brookfield station was originally built in 1889 as Grossdale station, when Samuel Eberly Gross, a Chicago lawyer, began selling building lots platted from farms and woodlands he had acquired along both sides of the Chicago, Burlington & Quincy Railroad line. Brookfield itself was originally known as "Grossdale," the name a request by Gross in return for the land used by the railroad. The station was the first building Gross erected in the new subdivision. In 1981 the original station house was moved across the tracks onto the corner of Brookfield Avenue and Forest Avenue, and now houses the Brookfield Historical Society. The current Brookfield station serves as a standard commuter railroad station, while the old Grossdale station has been on the National Register of Historic Places since 1982.

Bus connections
Pace

References

External links 

Grossdale Station (Brookfield Historical Society)
Prairie Avenue entrance from Google Maps Street View

Metra stations in Illinois
Railway stations in the United States opened in 1889
Railway stations in Cook County, Illinois
Brookfield, Illinois
1889 establishments in Illinois